Ridgeland Township is one of twenty-six townships in Iroquois County, Illinois, USA.  As of the 2010 census, its population was 369 and it contained 173 housing units. Ridgeland Township was formed from Onarga Township on January 29, 1879; the original name was Ridge Township, but the name was changed to Ridgeland Township on an unknown date.

Geography

Cities, towns, villages
 Thawville

Unincorporated towns
 Ridgeville at 
(This list is based on USGS data and may include former settlements.)

Cemeteries
The township contains Thawville Cemetery.

Major highways
  Interstate 57
  Illinois Route 54

Demographics

School districts
 Iroquois West Community Unit School District 10
 Paxton-Buckley-Loda Community Unit School District 10

Political districts
 Illinois' 15th congressional district
 State House District 105
 State Senate District 53

References
 
 United States Census Bureau 2007 TIGER/Line Shapefiles
 United States National Atlas

External links
 City-Data.com
 Illinois State Archives

Townships in Iroquois County, Illinois
Townships in Illinois